Hashish, the Paradise of Hell (German: Haschisch, das Paradies der Hölle) is a 1921 German silent drama film directed by Reinhard Bruck and starring Tilla Durieux, Fritz Kortner and Paul Hartmann.

The film's sets were designed by the art director Robert Neppach.

Cast
 Tilla Durieux as Sultanin 
 Fritz Kortner as Sultan 
 Paul Hartmann as Der Jüngling 
 Eva Seeberg as Die Braut
 Fritz Beckmann
 Paula Conrad as Addali - Assas Mutter 
 Wilhelm Diegelmann as Ober Enuch 
 Friedrich Kühne as Selim 
 Hermann Picha
 Leopold von Ledebur as Hassan - Aminas Artz

References

Bibliography
 Grange, William. Cultural Chronicle of the Weimar Republic. Scarecrow Press, 2008.

External links

1921 films
Films of the Weimar Republic
German silent feature films
Films directed by Reinhard Bruck
1921 drama films
German drama films
German black-and-white films
Silent drama films
1920s German films